William M. "Ad" Yale (April 17, 1870 – April 27, 1948) was a professional baseball player. He appeared in four games in Major League Baseball for the 1905 Brooklyn Superbas as a first baseman. He also had an extensive minor league baseball career, playing from 1897 until 1914 for a number of teams, primarily the Bridgeport Orators, for whom he played from 1898–1905.

External links

Major League Baseball first basemen
Brooklyn Superbas players
Bristol Braves players
Bridgeport Orators players
Springfield Ponies players
Toronto Maple Leafs (International League) players
Northampton Meadowlarks players
New Britain Perfectos players
Albany Senators players
York White Roses players
Lancaster Red Roses players
Baseball players from Connecticut
1870 births
1948 deaths